The third season of Friends, an American sitcom created by David Crane and Marta Kauffman, premiered on NBC on September 19, 1996. Friends was produced by Bright/Kauffman/Crane Productions, in association with Warner Bros. Television. The season contains 25 episodes and concluded airing on May 15, 1997.

Reception
Collider ranked the season #3 on their ranking of the ten Friends seasons, and picked "The One with the Morning After" as its best episode.

Cast and characters

(In particular, Introduced in season 3 or Only in season 3)

Main cast
 Jennifer Aniston as Rachel Green
 Courteney Cox as Monica Geller
 Lisa Kudrow as Phoebe Buffay
 Matt LeBlanc as Joey Tribbiani
 Matthew Perry as Chandler Bing
 David Schwimmer as Ross Geller

Recurring cast
 Maggie Wheeler as Janice Litman
 Jon Favreau as Pete Becker
 Steven Eckholdt as Mark Robinson
 Angela Featherstone as Chloe
 Giovanni Ribisi as Frank Buffay, Jr.
 Dina Meyer as Kate Miller
 James Michael Tyler as Gunther
 Teri Garr as Phoebe Abbott
 Jennifer Milmore as Lauren

Guest stars
 Tom Selleck as Richard Burke
 June Gable as Estelle Leonard
 David Arquette as Malcolm
 Christine Taylor as Bonnie
 Larry Hankin as Mr. Heckles
 Isabella Rossellini as herself
 E.G. Daily as Leslie
 Sherilyn Fenn as Ginger
 Robin Williams as Tomas
 Billy Crystal as Tim
 Ben Stiller as Tommy
 Matt Battaglia as Vince
 Robert Gant as Jason
 Suzanna Voltaire as Margha
 Sam McMurray as Doug
 Debra Jo Rupp as Alice

Episodes

References

External links
 

03
1996 American television seasons
1997 American television seasons